Ivar Stafuza (born 6 November 1961) is an Argentinean retired footballer.

References

External links
 

Argentine footballers
Living people
Association football defenders
Association football midfielders
1961 births
Boca Juniors footballers
Club Atlético Banfield footballers
Guaraní Antonio Franco footballers
Talleres de Remedios de Escalada footballers
Argentine Primera División players
Primera Nacional players
Torneo Argentino A players
People from Reconquista, Santa Fe
Sportspeople from Santa Fe Province